The 1963–64 season was the 84th season of competitive football in England, from August 1963 to May 1964.

Diary of the season 
 17 August 1963 – Reigning league champions Everton won the Charity Shield after a 4–0 win over FA Cup winners Manchester United.
 14 September 1963 – George Best, a 17-year-old Northern Irish winger, makes his debut for Manchester United in their 1–0 First Division win over West Bromwich Albion.
 23 October 1963 – an England versus Rest of the World XI match is staged to mark the centenary of The Football Association. Against a star-studded opposition team containing Alfredo Di Stéfano, Ferenc Puskás, Denis Law, Lev Yashin and Eusébio, England won 2–1 with goals from Terry Paine and Jimmy Greaves, while Denis Law scored for the Rest of the World.
 26 December 1963 – 66 goals were scored in the 10 First Division matches. Fulham were the biggest winners, defeating Ipswich Town 10–1.
 5 April 1964 – Tottenham captain Danny Blanchflower, 38, announced his retirement from playing.
 8 April 1964 – Blackburn Rovers are announced as England's participant in the 1964 edition of the International Soccer League.
 11 April 1964 – Scotland beat England 1–0 in the British Home Championship to leave the two level on four points in the final table. Northern Ireland subsequently defeated Wales to finish level on points with the other two, thus ensuring that the title was shared between three nations.
 12 April 1964 – The Sunday People publishes allegations that lead to a betting scandal. It reported that Mansfield Town player Jimmy Gauld had, over several years, systematically engaged in match fixing, and that many other players were involved.
 18 April 1964 – Liverpool beat Arsenal 5–0 at Anfield to secure the title. In their penultimate game of the season, Ipswich Town lose 3–1 to Blackburn Rovers, confirming their relegation two years after winning the League championship.
 22 April 1964 – Leicester City win the League Cup – their first major trophy – with a 4–3 aggregate victory over Stoke City.
 25 April 1964 – On the final day of the Second Division season, Leeds United win 2–0 at Charlton Athletic and Sunderland fail to beat Grimsby Town, meaning Leeds were crowned champions.
 2 May 1964 – West Ham United beat Preston North End 3–2 at Wembley to win the FA Cup for the first time. Trailing 2–1 at half time, West Ham scored two second half goals to deny Preston.

Notable debutants 
 14 September 1963 – George Best, 17-year-old Northern Irish winger, makes his debut for Manchester United against West Bromwich Albion in the First Division.

Notable retirements 
 5 April 1964 – Danny Blanchflower, 38-year-old Tottenham Hotspur captain.

Honours 

Notes = Number in parentheses is the times that club has won that honour. * indicates new record for competition

Awards 
Football Writers' Association
 Footballer of the Year – Bobby Moore (West Ham United)
Top goalscorer
 Jimmy Greaves (Tottenham Hotspur), 35

Football League

First Division 
Liverpool clinched the First Division title just two seasons after winning promotion, finishing four points ahead of runners-up Manchester United while defending champions Everton finished third. 

Tottenham Hotspur managed to finish fourth despite not winning any silverware and being without many key players for much of the season due to injury, while captain Danny Blanchflower announced his retirement from playing just before the season's end. Tragedy then struck the club after the season was over, when forward John White was struck by lightning and killed on a North London golf course. 

Chelsea enjoyed a strong return to the First Division by finishing fifth, while Leicester City finally got their hands on a major trophy by winning the League Cup.

With Alf Ramsey having now left Ipswich Town to manage the England team, Ipswich Town struggled badly under his successor Jackie Milburn, and went down in bottom place having conceded 121 goals just two seasons after being league champions. Bolton Wanderers, who had gradually faded away since the retirement of centre-forward Nat Lofthouse in 1960, also went down.

Second Division 
Leeds United returned to the First Division after seven years away by clinching the Second Division title under ambitious manager Don Revie, while Sunderland's six-year exile from the First Division was ended by promotion as Second Division runners-up. 

Grimsby Town and Scunthorpe United slipped into the Third Division.

Third Division 
Coventry City made the breakthrough into the Second Division as champions of the Third Division, finishing level on points at the top of the league with Crystal Palace.

Notts County, Wrexham, Crewe Alexandra and Millwall were all relegated to the Fourth Division.

Fourth Division 
Gillingham finished champions of the Fourth Division, ahead of runners-up Carlisle United on goal average. They enjoyed a narrow lead over third placed Workington and fourth placed Exeter City. Bradford City bounced back from having to apply for re-election to just missing out on promotion in the space of a season.

Top goalscorers

First Division
Jimmy Greaves (Tottenham Hotspur) – 35 goals

Second Division
Ron Saunders (Portsmouth) – 33 goals

Third Division
Alfie Biggs (Bristol Rovers) – 30 goals

Fourth Division
Hughie McIlmoyle (Carlisle United) – 39 goals

European club competitions

European Champions' Cup 
 Everton – Preliminary round

UEFA Cup Winners' Cup 
 Manchester United – Quarter-finals
 Tottenham Hotspur – Second round

Inter-Cities Fairs Cup 
 Arsenal – Second round
 Sheffield Wednesday – Second round

National team 
The England national football team had an eventful season with a shared victory in the 1964 British Home Championship, another success against a Rest of the World XI in one of the most famous matches ever played at Wembley and a tour of the Americas upon the season's conclusion which culminated in a dire performance in Brazil during the 1964 Taça de Nações.

American tour 

Taça das Nações

Other matches

References